The 2020 DC Defenders season was the first season for the DC Defenders as a professional American football franchise. They were playing as charter members of the XFL, one of eight teams to compete in the league for the 2020 season. The Defenders played their home games at Audi Field and were led by head coach Pep Hamilton.

Their inaugural season was cut short due to the COVID-19 pandemic and the XFL officially suspended operations for the remainder of the season on March 20, 2020.

Standings

Schedule
All times Eastern

Final roster

Staff

Season summary 
During the first two weeks of the XFL season, the Defenders got off to a hot start, beating the Seattle Dragons in the first XFL game by a score of 31–19 at home, and dominating the New York Guardians at home 27–0. However, Cardale Jones and the Defenders got into a slump the next two weeks, falling to 2-2 and losing back to back games on the road; first to the Los Angeles Wildcats 39–9, and then to the Tampa Bay Vipers 25–0.  The Defenders were able to rebound in week 5 thanks to Tyree Jackson, winning against the St. Louis Battlehawks at home 15-6 and improving their record to 3-2 before the XFL officially suspended operations 12 days later.

Game summaries

Week 1: vs. Seattle Dragons

This was the first-ever XFL game, and the Defenders would have the first score (although Seattle had the first touchdown) and the first win of the XFL.

Week 2: vs. New York Guardians

In the fourth quarter, the Defenders tried for a three-point conversion, the first three-point attempt in the XFL.

Week 3: at Los Angeles Wildcats

Week 4: at Tampa Bay Vipers

Week 5: vs. St. Louis BattleHawks

References

DC
2020 in sports in Washington, D.C.
DC Defenders seasons